Meshkan Rural District is a rural district (dehestan) in Poshtkuh District, Neyriz County, Fars Province, Iran. At the 2006 census, its population was 265, in 89 families.  The rural district has 10 villages.

References 

Rural Districts of Fars Province
Neyriz County